Ollerton is a town in the Newark and Sherwood District, Nottinghamshire, England, on the edge of Sherwood Forest in the area known as the Dukeries. It forms part of the civil parish of Ollerton and Boughton. The population of this civil parish at the 2011 census was 9,840.

History 
Ollerton is a settlement listed in Domesday Book, located in the Bassetlaw Wapentake or hundred in the county of Nottinghamshire at a crossing of the River Maun. In 1086 it had a recorded population of 15 households, and is listed in the Domesday Book under two owners.  Formerly a rural village with a tradition of hop-growing centred on the parish church of St Giles the settlement has its origins at a point where three main routes cross. The A614 linking Nottingham north through Sherwood Forest to Blyth, Nottinghamshire and on to the large minster town of Doncaster; the A6075 linking Mansfield with the ferry crossing of the River Trent at Dunham-on-Trent and on via the A57 road to the cathedral city of Lincoln, England; and the A616 linking Sheffield with the Great North Road Great Britain at Newark-on-Trent. From the 1920s onwards the main industry was coal mining with Ollerton expanding greatly during the 1960s and 1970s. The colliery was sunk in the 1920s and completed during the General Strike of 1926, which led to a saying of "Ollerton was ever built with scab labour". During the expansion of the pit, many miners from closed collieries in north-eastern England and Scotland moved to work at Ollerton. There was a large Polish community amongst the miners at Ollerton, estimated to make up roughly half the workforce at the time of the 1984-1985 strike.

Ollerton Colliery was considered one of the most left-wing pits in Nottinghamshire, and was subject to heavy picketing at the time of the ballot by the Nottinghamshire branch of the National Union of Mineworkers in March 1984. A miner from Ackton Hall Colliery, near Featherstone, West Yorkshire died at Ollerton when picketing during the miners' strike on 15 April 1984. David Gareth Jones was hit in the neck by a brick thrown by a local youth when he was picketing, but the post-mortem ruled that it had not caused his death and that it was more likely to have been caused by being pressed against the pit gates earlier in the day. News of his death led to hundreds of pickets staying in Ollerton town centre overnight.  At the request of Nottinghamshire Police, Arthur Scargill appeared and called for calm in the wake of the tragedy. However, several working miners in Ollerton reported that their gardens and cars had been vandalised during the night. A memorial bench was sited near the spot where David died. As a mark of respect for Jones, Ollerton Colliery closed for a few days afterwards.

Ollerton features in a related song by Australian singer Darren Hayes entitled "A Hundred Challenging Things A Boy Can Do" on his 2007 album This Delicate Thing We've Made. The mine closed in 1994. Subsequently, the land around the mine was reclaimed and redeveloped as an ecologically sustainable  "village" of commercial offices, including a large nearby Tesco superstore.

Ollerton was an ancient parish, and became a civil parish in 1866.  The civil parish was abolished in 1996 and merged with the parish of Boughton to form the new civil parish of Ollerton and Boughton.

Landmarks 
In the old part of the original village, Ollerton Watermill was built in 1713 on the River Maun. It operated commercially producing flour until 1984. Restored in 1993, it now houses a teashop and exhibition. Ollerton Town has a local football team, Ollerton Town F.C.

Transport 
Ollerton is served by Stagecoach Mansfield, Travel Wright. Stagecoach Bassetlaw run the Sherwood Arrow between Worksop/Retford-Ollerton-Nottingham every 60 minutes.

Ollerton was served by a station on the Shirebrook to Lincoln line. The line is in use for track testing between Dukeries Junction and Shirebrook. But the through route closed to Lincoln in 1980. The station survives and there is some ambition to reinstate passenger train services to the town by using the current test track line from Shirebrook on the Robin Hood Line to a terminus at Ollerton. With possible stations at Warsop and Edwinstowe.

Notable residents 
Ollerton is the birthplace of Tim Flear OBE, MVO, former career diplomat and HM Consul-General in Rio de Janeiro, Brazil 2006–10 and Milan, Italy 2014–19.

References 

Newark and Sherwood
Towns in Nottinghamshire
Former civil parishes in Nottinghamshire